The Dalston Synagogue (also known as the Poets Road Synagogue) was a Jewish place of worship in the London Borough of Islington, North London, from about 1885 to 1970. Jews fleeing the pogroms of the Russian Empire, and those beginning to leave the East End of London and move northwards towards Stoke Newington and Stamford Hill established a congregation in the neighbourhood by 1876. The Victorian Gothic building was erected in Poets Road in 1885, a street just outside the boundaries of Dalston, and became one of the leading members of the United Synagogues.

Jacob Koussevitzsky, a member of the famous Koussevitzky cantorial family, was its cantor from 1936, though another source says the 1950s.

At its height, the Poets Road Synagogue had hundreds of worshippers; it closed in the late 1960s, as the remaining Jewish population moved further afield. The synagogue site was eventually sold and the building, along with its stained glass windows, was demolished in 1970 and replaced by a block of council flats, leaving no trace of the Jewish life which existed in this area.

Religious neighbours
Other religious institutions existed nearby. The original Adath Israel orthodox congregation was founded in this area and its first permanent building was in Alma Road, off Green Lanes, before moving on towards Stoke Newington and the other side of Clissold Park in the 1950s. The Shacklewell Lane synagogue was located in Dalston, close to the Ridley Road market. Since the Poets Road synagogue, which was really located in Canonbury, was called the Dalston Synagogue, the Shacklewell Lane synagogue had to take on the name of the New Dalston Synagogue. This building is now a mosque.  Other nearby synagogues included the Finsbury Park synagogue, close to Clissold Park and Manor House, and the smaller, less formal, Goldblums Shtiebel in Highbury New Park.

From the mid-seventeenth century, Newington Green had been known as an area tolerant of religious minorities, specifically Dissenters, and the church on the green reflected that. Its minister from 1947, John Reece Walker, was known as an interfaith worker, and "made a remarkable contribution to the cause of good relations between Christians and Jews in North London". Also on the green was the China Inland Mission, founded in 1865 and its headquarters built in 1895. St Matthias, one of London's foremost High Churches, was built nearby from 1849 to 1853, Pre-dating all of these is the impressive Anglican church in the parish of Stoke Newington; it is dedicated to St Mary, as is the "new" (1858) church opposite, by Sir George Gilbert Scott.

Religious leaders and clergy
After World War II, the Dalston synagogue was led by the Rev. Joseph Rabinowitz. Following his retirement, the community appointed Rabbi Isaac Newman, formerly of the St Albans Synagogue. His appointment coincided with the amalgamation of the synagogue with the North London synagogue in Lofting Road. But this was a period when Jews were leaving Islington for greener pastures further north and north west. The period of the 1960s also coincided with the Louis Jacobs affair, possibly the biggest rift in Anglo Jewry. Rabbi Newman supported Jacobs, which led him into confrontation with his own synagogue lay leadership and with the United Synagogue.

Newman later moved to the Barnet synagogue where he served for twenty years, He retired to Israel, where he influenced the creation of Rabbis for Human Rights. He died in Jerusalem in 2011.

Following the synagogue's closure in 1967, members of the community were given the choice of joining either the New Dalston Synagogue in Shacklewell Lane or the Finsbury Park Synagogue near Manor House and Clissold Park, both of which have since ceased to operate. The former became a mosque, while the latter was, for a short period, a yeshiva serving the ultra-orthodox residents of Stoke Newington and Stamford Hill.

References

Further reading
 The Village that Changed the World: A History of Newington Green London N16 by Alex Allardyce. Newington Green Action Group: 2008.
Chapter titles: Beginnings, Kings and Treason; Dissenters, Academies and Castaways; The Chaste Old Bachelor of Newington Green; Enlightenment, Revolutions and Poets; Development, Destruction and Renewal.
Peter Renton, The Lost Synagogues of London, Tymsder Publishers, 2000.

External links

 Dalston Synagogue on Jewish Communities and Records - UK (hosted by jewishgen.org), accessed 24 November 2010.

Former synagogues in London
19th-century synagogues